Bolshoye Borisovo is a rural locality (a selo) in Seletskoye Rural Settlement, Suzdalsky District, Vladimir Oblast, Russia. The population was 112 as of 2010. There are 5 streets.

Geography 
Bolshoye Borisovo is located 23 km northeast of Suzdal (the district's administrative centre) by road. Subbotino is the nearest rural locality.

References 

Rural localities in Suzdalsky District
Suzdalsky Uyezd